John Joye or Joyce was an member of the Parliament of England for Lincoln in 1584.

References

English MPs 1584–1585
Year of birth missing
Year of death missing